Gulf Winds is the seventeenth studio album (and nineteenth overall) by Joan Baez, released in 1976. It was her final album of new material for A&M. Baez stated in her autobiography, And a Voice to Sing With, that most of the songs were written while on tour with the Rolling Thunder Revue with Bob Dylan. "O Brother!" was a clever reply to Dylan's song "Oh Sister". On the title song, a ten-minute long autobiographical recollection of her childhood, Baez accompanies herself only with her own acoustic guitar (the rest of the album features standard mid-1970s pop/rock backup), creating a sound reminiscent of her earliest pure folk recordings.

Gulf Winds is the only Baez album without any covers; each song was written by Baez herself.

From the album's liner notes:

"Sometimes, I wake up at night and write a song.  Sometimes a tune comes to my head when I'm walking in the hills, and I have to make up words for it.  Sometimes I sit in a bar in San Francisco and scribble into a notepad what I call my 'streams of unconsciousness.'  When I have enough scribbles in the pad, and enough tunes in my head, I go into the studio and make an album.  That's how I made this one."
- Joan Baez

Track listing
All tracks composed by Joan Baez

Side One
"Sweeter for Me" 4:25
"Seabirds" 4:32
"Caruso" 3:42
"Still Waters at Night" 3:01
"Kingdom of Childhood" 7:51

Side Two
"O Brother!" 3:19
"Time Is Passing Us By" 3:43
"Stephanie's Room" 4:05
"Gulf Winds" 10:29

Personnel
Joan Baez – vocals, acoustic guitar, piano, synthesizer
Duck Dunn – bass
Jim Gordon – drums
Ray Kelley – cello
Jesse Ehrlich – cello
Larry Knechtel – acoustic and electric piano, organ
Dean Parks – acoustic and electric guitar, mandolin, string arrangements, conductor
Sid Sharp – violin
Malcolm Cecil – synthesizer effects, synthesizer programming
Technical
Tommy Vicari - mix engineer
Bernard Gelb - executive producer
Roland Young - art direction
Chuck Beeson - design
Johanna Van Zantwyk - photography
"Special thanks to Carlos Bernal"

Chart positions

References

1976 albums
Joan Baez albums
A&M Records albums
Albums produced by David Kershenbaum